Lee Yoon-ki (born 1965), is a South Korean film director and screenwriter.

Career
Lee Yoon-ki earned his MA in business administration/economics at the University of Southern California. After returning to Korea, he worked as a producer and director of several short films. His first feature, This Charming Girl, attracted much attention from major film festivals, including Sundance and Berlin. His second feature, Love Talk, was invited to compete at the Karlovy Vary International Film Festival, and his third and fourth features, Ad-lib Night and My Dear Enemy were both critically acclaimed.

Since his debut, Lee has emerged as one of Korea's leading sources of small-budgeted, intimate dramas about ordinary people. He is particularly skilled at inhabiting the worlds of female characters, and he has worked with a range of impressive up and coming actresses including Kim Ji-soo, Han Hyo-joo and Im Soo-jung, and most importantly Korea's top actress Jeon Do-yeon. Though Lee empathizes with women marginalized by a patriarchal society, he refuses to exploit easy cultural signifiers to arouse audience sympathy. The characters also remain rather elusive amidst Lee's always-atmospheric images. But if his films are refreshingly unsentimental, their imagery is also refreshingly evocative, more romantic than realist.

He considers Hou Hsiao-hsien as his film mentor. Other influences are Robert Altman’s earlier works, Woody Allen, Martin Scorsese, and other American independent films from the 70s and 80s, including the Coen brothers’ Blood Simple. His favorite artist is Edward Hopper.

Filmography
This Charming Girl (여자, 정혜), 2004
Love Talk (러브토크), 2005
Ad-lib Night (아주 특별한 손님), 2006
My Dear Enemy (멋진 하루), 2008 
Come Rain, Come Shine (사랑한다, 사랑하지 않는다), 2011
A Man and a Woman (남과 여), 2016
One Day (어느날), 2017

Awards and nominations
This Charming Girl
NETPAC Award - 2005, Berlin International Film Festival
New Currents Award - 2005, Pusan International Film Festival
Grand Jury Prize, World Cinema (Dramatic) - 2005, Sundance Film Festival

Love Talk
Crystal Globe - 2005, Karlovy Vary International Film Festival (Nominated)

References

External links

1965 births
Living people
South Korean film directors
Best Director Paeksang Arts Award (film) winners